Uganda Red Cross Society (URCS) was founded in 1962 and previously it was part of the British Red Cross. It has its headquarters in Kampala.

The Uganda Red Cross the biggest indigenous humanitarian organization in Uganda.

History of the Uganda Red Cross 

It started as a branch of the British Red Cross in 1941. In 1964 under an act of Parliament, the Uganda Red Cross Constitution was adopted bringing into existence the Uganda Red Cross Society.  A year later in 1965, the Society was admitted as a member of the International Committee of the Red Cross and Red Crescent Societies.

Uganda Red Cross Society has continued to grow over the years and it now has 51 branches and 30 sub-branches spanning the whole of Uganda. The National Society also works with a number of partners in the execution of its mission. These include the Government of Uganda, United Nations agencies, international funding agencies, companies and practicing sister Red Cross National Societies.

The Uganda Red Cross Society operates throughout the country through its 51 branches and several sub branches.

External links 

 Official website

References 

Red Cross and Red Crescent national societies
1962 establishments in Uganda
Organizations established in 1962
Medical and health organisations based in Uganda